The Australia women's under-19 cricket team represents Australia in international under-19 women's cricket. The team is administrated by Cricket Australia.

The team played their first official matches at the 2023 ICC Under-19 Women's T20 World Cup, the first ever international women's under-19 cricket competition, in which they reached the semi-finals.

History
Since 2003, Australian Under-19 cricket teams have been formed to play matches against other national age-group and development teams. These matches carried no formal ICC designation.

The inaugural Women's Under-19 World Cup was scheduled to take place in January 2021, but was postponed multiple times due to the COVID-19 pandemic. The tournament was eventually scheduled to take place in 2023, in South Africa. As a Full Member of the ICC, Australia qualified automatically for the tournament.

Australia announced their 15-player squad for the tournament on 13 December 2022. Former Australia international Sarah Aley was chosen as Head Coach of the side for the tournament, assisted by Erin Osborne and Dulip Samaraweera. They reached the semi-finals of the tournament, but were beaten by England by 3 runs.

Recent call-ups
The table below lists all the players who have been selected in recent squads for Australia under-19s. Currently, this only includes the squad for the 2023 ICC Under-19 Women's T20 World Cup.

Records & statistics
International match summary

As of 27 January 2023

Youth Women's Twenty20 record versus other nations

As of 27 January 2023

Leading runs scorers

Leading wickets takers

Highest individual innings

Best individual bowling figures

Highest team totals

Lowest team totals

Under-19 World Cup record

References

Women's Under-19 cricket teams
C
Australia in international cricket